Marvin José Ceballos Flores (born 22 April 1992) is a Guatemalan professional footballer who last played as a midfielder for Liga Nacional club Xinabajul and the Guatemala national team.

Career

Comunicaciones
Ceballos made his professional debut with C.S.D. Comunicaciones of the Liga Nacional de Fútbol de Guatemala on 21 August 2011 against Xelajú. He started the match and earned a yellow card as Comunicaciones lost 1–0. He made his international club debut three days later in the CONCACAF Champions League against Costa Rican side, Herediano. He started that match and scored the first goal for his side as they went on to win 2–0. Ceballos then scored his first league goal of his career on 7 December 2011 against Xelajú as Comunicaciones won 3–0.

Ceballos ended the 2013–14 season with nine yellow cards but lowered that down to two for the 2014–15 season.

Indy Eleven
On 4 August 2015, it was announced that Ceballos had signed with Indy Eleven of the North American Soccer League in the United States.

Carolina RailHawks
After one season in Indianapolis, Ceballos signed with fellow NASL side Carolina RailHawks.

Leones Negros UdeG
On 2 July 2019, Ceballos signed with Leones Negros UdeG of the Ascenso MX in Mexico.

International
Ceballos made his international debut for Guatemala on 4 September 2010 against Nicaragua. He came on as a 53rd-minute substitute for Henry Medina as Guatemala won 5–0.

Ceballos was a part of the Guatemala U20 side that played in the 2011 FIFA U-20 World Cup. It was his 81st-minute goal against Croatia U20 that lead his side to a 1–0 victory and a ticket to the Round of 16.

Honours
Comunicaciones
Liga Nacional de Guatemala: Clausura 2011, Clausura 2014, Clausura 2015

Guastatoya
Liga Nacional de Guatemala: Apertura 2020

Career statistics

International goals
Scores and results list Guatemala's goal tally first.

References

2021 CONCACAF Gold Cup players
1992 births
Living people
Sportspeople from Guatemala City
Guatemalan footballers
Guatemalan expatriate footballers
North American Soccer League players
Ascenso MX players
Liga Nacional de Fútbol de Guatemala players
Comunicaciones F.C. players
Indy Eleven players
Antigua GFC players
North Carolina FC players
C.D. Guastatoya players
Leones Negros UdeG footballers
Association football midfielders
Guatemala international footballers
Expatriate soccer players in the United States
Expatriate footballers in Mexico
Guatemalan expatriate sportspeople in the United States
Guatemalan expatriate sportspeople in Mexico
Guatemala under-20 international footballers
Guatemala youth international footballers